The Merovingian name Genovefa is rendered in French as Geneviève.
Saint Genovefa, patroness of Paris, see Genevieve.
Genovefa of Brabant, of medieval legend.
Genovefa Weber (1764-1798), German opera singer